HIET is an initialism that may refer to:

 Hamdard Institute of Engineering Technology, see Hamdard University, Pakistan
 Hindustan Institute of Engineering Technology, Tamil Nadu, India